The  is the head of the local government of Hokkaido, Japan's largest prefecture. The seat of the local government is located in Sapporo, the capital city of the prefecture. The current governor is Naomichi Suzuki.

List of governors 
This is the list of the governors of Hokkaido.

 
Hokkaido Prefecture
Hokkaido